Rao Ruda Singh was an Ahir King and a scion of the family of Raos which have ruled over Rajasthan since the eighth century A.D. who cleared the jungle in Ahirwal in 1555 and founded new villages.

See also
 Rao Tula Ram
 Rao Mitrasen Ahir

References

History of Haryana
Indian nobility
16th-century Indian people